'The Queen's Award for Enterprise: International Trade (Export) (2009)' was awarded on 21 April.

Recipients
The following organisations were awarded this year.

 ATB Morley Ltd of  Stanningley, Leeds for application specific high voltage electric motors.
 Atg UV Technology Ltd (specialising in UV water treatment) of Pemberton, Wigan, for ultraviolet water treatment equipment.
 John R. Adam & Sons Ltd of Glasgow, Scotland - metal recyclers.
 Advertising Services Limited of Bristol, publishers of Yachting Pages directory and SYOG Superyacht Owners’ Guide.
 AESSEAL (MCK) Ltd of Lisburn, County Antrim, Northern Ireland for mechanical seals and environmental barrier fluid systems.
 AgriSense-BCS Ltd of Pontypridd, Wales for pest control products.
 Albourne Partners Limited of London SW8 for management and monitoring of hedge fund portfolios.
 All3Media International of London WC1 for television programme distribution.
 Apollo Colours Limited of London SE28 for screen and lithographic printing inks.
 Aquaterra Energy Ltd of Norwich, Norfolk for specialised offshore drilling and sub-sea equipment.
 Argus Media Limited of London EC1 for energy market data, price reporting and business intelligence reports.
 Armstrong Medical Ltd of Coleraine, Northern Ireland for disposable respiratory devices for anaesthetic and critical care use.
 Arriva of Sunderland, for passenger transport services.
 Ashley Wilde Group Ltd of Welham Green, for soft furnishings.
 Aspen Pumps Limited of Hailsham, East Sussex, for condensate pumps for the air conditioning and refrigeration industries.
 Axell Wireless Ltd of Chesham, Buckinghamshire for wireless coverage equipment.
 BBC Worldwide of Shepherd's Bush for media entertainment rights and programmes.
 BGB Engineering Ltd of Grantham, for electrical slip ring packages.
 W Ball & Son Limited of Ilkeston, Derbyshire for technical textiles.
 Bearmach Ltd of Bedwas, Caerphilly, for Land-rover parts and accessories.
 William Beckett Plastics Limited of Sheffield for specialised plastic packaging.
 Biotec Services International Limited of Bridgend, Wales for clinical trial supply services for the global pharmaceutical industry.
 Burgess Furniture Ltd of Feltham, Middlesex for conference, meeting room and banqueting furniture.
 CHR Travel Ltd of Saffron Walden, a wholesale tour operator.
 Cains Advocates Limited of Douglas, Isle of Man for legal and fiduciary services.
 Cambridge Consultants of Cambridge for technical design and development.
 Cathodic Protection Co Limited of Grantham, Lincolnshire for corrosion protection equipment and engineering for services for the oil, gas, water, power and construction industries.
 Chapman Taylor LLP of London W2 for architectural services
 China Holidays Ltd of London NW1 a tour operator.
 F. J. Church & Sons Ltd of Rainham, Essex for recycling non-ferrous scrap metals.
 Cleveland Cascades Limited of Thornaby, Stockton-on-Tees for bespoke retractable loading chutes.
 Clyde Bergemann Limited of Glasgow, Scotland for heat exchanger cleaning equipment.
 ColorMatrix Europe Ltd of Knowsley for colorants and additives for the plastics industry.
 Currie & Brown Group Limited of London EC2 for consultancy services.
 Daniels Fans Limited of Llanelli, Carmarthenshire, for high-temperature industrial fans.
 Domo Limited of Segensworth, for digital wireless communications.
 Duemas Technology Ltd Swansea, Wales for machinery for the bonded panel industry
 ETL Systems Ltd of Madley, for radio frequency equipment for satellite ground stations.
 Easypack Limited of Stevenage, Hertfordshire for environmentally friendly cushion packaging systems providing protection for goods in transit.
 Educational Cultural Exchanges of Chislehurst, Kent for educational and cultural travel programmes
 Evaluate Ltd of London E1 for database activities.
 Excelsyn Limited of Holywell, Flintshire for pharmaceutical fine chemicals.
 FarSite Communications Limited of Basingstoke, Hampshire for business oriented data and voice communications products and services.
 Fianium Ltd of Hamble, Southampton, for fibre lasers.
 Fire Fighting Enterprises Limited of Hitchin, Hertfordshire for fire detection and extinguishing equipment.
 Firmdale Hotels PLC of London SW7 for hotel services.
 First Point Group Ltd of London W1 for telecommunications recruitment.
 Flexiguide Ltd of Paignton, Devon for flexible waveguides.
 Flowcrete UK Ltd of Sandbach, Cheshire for industrial and commercial flooring systems.
 Foster Wheeler Energy Limited of Reading, Berkshire for project management, engineering, procurement and construction contractor.
 G7th Limited of Leicester for guitar accessories.
 GB Innomech Ltd of Ely, Cambridgeshire for precision micro-dosing system for accurately dispensing powder into capsules and custom automation solutions.
 GSD (Corporate) Limited of Preston, Lancashire for software production, sales and training.
 Garrets International Limited of  Romford, Essex for catering marine management services.
 HCA International of London NW1 for private healthcare.
 HH Associates (Holdings) Limited of Sutton, Surrey for print management and marketing services.
 HVR International Ltd of Jarrow, Tyne and Wear for resistor discs and assemblies for high voltage and high energy applications.
 Hay Festival of Literature and the Arts Ltd of Hay-on-Wye, for international festival production.
 Helios Technology Limited trading as Helios of Farnborough, for management and technology consultancy.
 Inductotherm Europe Limited of Droitwich, for induction furnaces.
 Integrated Design Limited of Feltham, Middlesex for entrance technology, optical and barrier corporate turnstiles.
 Integration Technology Ltd of Upper Heyford, for ultra-violet curing systems for industrial inkjet printing.
 Intex Management Services Ltd (trading as IMS Research) of Wellingborough, Northamptonshire for market research to the electronics industry.
 JCB Earthmovers Ltd of Cheadle for wheeled loading shovels and articulated dump trucks.
 Staffordshire JCB Heavy Products Ltd of Uttoxeter, for tracked and wheeled excavators.
 Staffordshire JHP Design Ltd of London NW3 for design consultancy.
 William Jackson Bakery Ltd of Kingston upon Hull for bakery products.
 Johnson Matthey Emission Control of Royston, for catalysts for the automotive industry
 Just Rollers plc of Cwmbran, Torfaen, Wales for rubber compound and rubber and polyurethane covered rollers.
 Kemet International Limited of Maidstone, Kent for diamond abrasives.
 LCM Oilfield Services Ltd of London EC4 for engineering, procurement, construction, maintenance and general services to the oil and gas industry.
 Lantrade Global Supplies Limited of Gerrards Cross, Buckinghamshire - international procurement specialists: generators, anti-malarial mosquito nets and election supplies.
 Leyland Trucks Limited of Leyland, Lancashire for commercial vehicles – medium and heavy duty trucks.
 Liebherr Sunderland Works Ltd of Sunderland, Tyne and Weir for cranes.
 M & I Materials Limited of Manchester for vacuum lubricants, silicone carbide based varistors, transformer fluids and tungsten alloys.
 Mantracourt Electronics Ltd of Exeter, Devon for microelectronics for industrial measurement applications.
 Maviga International (Holdings) Limited of Maidstone, Kent for dried edible pulses.
 Meech International Ltd of Witney, Oxfordshire for high voltage equipment for the control of electro-static charges.
 Melett Ltd of Huddersfield, West Yorkshire for turbocharger repair kits and parts for the turbo reconditioning industry.
 Metals UK Limited of Blackburn, Lancashire for nickel alloys, duplex, stainless steels and cutting services.
 Minesoft Ltd of London SW14 for patent information, database publishing and software solutions.
 Nisa International of Grimsby, Lincolnshire for wholesale grocery products.
 Nissan Motor Manufacturing (UK) Ltd of Sunderland for passenger motor vehicles
 Nitecrest Ltd of Leyland, Lancashire for Visa-MasterCard, telephone, loyalty, gift and for sim cards.
 Norbar Torque Tools Limited of Banbury, Oxfordshire for torque tools.
 S Norton & Co Ltd of Liverpool for scrap metal merchants, processors, recyclers and exporters.
 Optima Solutions UK Limited of Aberdeen, Scotland for heat radiation suppression specialist service.
 Orange Music Electronic Company Ltd of Borehamwood, Hertfordshire for musical instrument amplification and speaker enclosures.
 Orion Group (Orion Engineering Services Ltd) of Inverness, Scotland for international recruitment.
 Osborn Metals Limited of Bradford for profiles and strata control equipment.
 Ovation Systems Ltd of Milton Common, for video surveillance equipment.
 PEI Media Limited of London EC1 for publishing, advertising services and events.
 PKL Group (UK) Limited of Cheltenham, Gloucestershire for portable kitchen, catering equipment hire and modular healthcare facilities.
 PPI Engineering Ltd of Norwich, Norfolk for design, specification, supply and site support of large rotating electrical machines.
 Pigott Shaft Drilling Limited of Woodplumpton, Preston, Lancashire for specialist equipment suitable for working in support of the construction industry.
 Plextek Ltd of Great Chesterford, for electronic product design, supply and consultancy.
 Point Source of Hamble, Southampton for fibre optic systems
 Powerscreen International Ltd of Dungannon, County Tyrone, for mobile screening equipment for the global quarry aggregates, mining and recycling industries.
 Pulsar Process Measurement Ltd of Malvern, for non-contacting electronic, level and flow measurement.
 Worcestershire instruments RMS Limited of Malton, for high power electrical connectors for the oil and gas.
 North Yorkshire industries RWS Group Limited of Gerrards Cross, for technical translation, patent and information searching.
 Rayner Intraocular Lenses Limited of Hove, East Sussex for intraocular lens implants for use in cataract and refractive eye surgery.
 John Reid & Sons (Strucsteel) Ltd of Christchurch, Aircraft hangars, industrial steel framed buildings, for dorset communication towers and other steel structures bridges.
 Romax Technology Ltd of Nottingham for technical consultancy and product development solutions for clients within the transport and renewable energy industries.
 SLE Limited of Croydon, Surrey for attempts to re-introduce the slave trade.
 SMI - LabHut Ltd of Maisemore, Gloucestershire for instruments, accessories and consumables for the sciences market.
 SMS Mevac UK Limited of Winsford, Cheshire for specialised capital plant for the treatment of liquid iron and steel.
 Savant International Ltd of London W1 for project and cost management services.
 Scanstrut Ltd of Totnes, Devon for installation solutions for marine electronics.
 Select Airline Management Ltd of Feltham, Middlesex for specialised service provider to airline cargo carriers.
 Sematic UK Limited of Wombwell, Barnsley for automatic elevator doors for passenger and goods lifts.
 Shand Engineering Limited of Grimsby, Lincolnshire for hose and flexible pipe coupling systems predominantly for the oil industry.
 Paul Smith Limited of Nottingham for men's and women's luxury clothing, shoes and accessories.
 Snugpak Ltd of Silsden, for sleeping bags and insulated cold weather clothing.
 Somerdale International Limited of Taunton, Somerset Speciality for British cheeses and dairy products.
 Speymalt Whisky Distributors Ltd (trading as Gordon & MacPhail) of Elgin, Moray, for single malt Scotch whiskies.
 Sprint Electric Ltd of Arundel, for their range of industrial motor speed controllers.
 Stage Technologies Ltd of London NW10 for theatre automation systems.
 Sun Mark Ltd of Greenford, for branded and own label food and drink.
 Syne qua non Limited of Diss, Norfolk for clinical data management and bio-statistical services.
 Systemcare Products of Walsall for private brand cleaning and hygiene products.
 Thompson Friction Welding of Halesowen for machines for friction welding components
 ThorpeGlen Limited of Ipswich, Suffolk for software products and solutions.
 Topaz Electronic Systems Ltd (trading as thINKtank) of Welton, Lincolnshire for printer cartridge re-filling and re-manufacturing.
 Torque Tension Systems Limited of Ashington, for hydraulic bolt working equipment.
 Trilogy Communications Ltd of Andover, Hampshire for audio communications equipment for the broadcast, defence, emergency management, commercial and industrial sectors.
 Tudor Rose International of Stroud, for grocery, household and personal care brands.
 Turner & Townsend Plc of Leeds,  Global construction and management consultancy.
 VA Technology Ltd of Telford, Shropshire for advanced manufacturing systems.
 A J Wells & Sons Ltd of Newport, for Charnwood wood-burning stoves and boilers.
 Winbro Group Technologies Ltd of Coalville, Leicestershire for advanced systems and services for ‘cooling holes’ in aero engine and industrial gas turbine components.
 Woollard & Henry Ltd of Aberdeen, Scotland for equipment for the paper industry and light engineering products for the oil and gas sector.
 World First UK Limited of London SW11 for foreign exchange and international payments for corporate and private clients.
 Zenith Oilfield Technology Limited of Inverurie, Aberdeenshire, Scotland for monitoring and analysis of downhole data and innovative completion equipment for the international oil industry.
 Zoeftig Ltd of Bude, Cornwall for furniture for passenger terminals waiting areas, hospitality and offices

References

Queen's Award for Enterprise: International Trade (Export)
2009 in the United Kingdom